The Fars is an Iranian newspaper in Fars Province. The concessionaires of this magazine were Forsat-od-Dowleh Shirazi and Fazlollah Banan and it was published in Shiraz since 1913.

See also
List of magazines and newspapers of Fars

References

Newspapers published in Fars Province
Mass media in Fars Province
Newspapers published in Qajar Iran